Tabernaemontana apoda is a species of plant in the family Apocynaceae. It is endemic to Cuba.  It is threatened by habitat loss.

References

Flora of Cuba
apoda
Critically endangered plants
Taxonomy articles created by Polbot